X-ray notation is a method of labeling atomic orbitals that grew out of X-ray science. Also known as IUPAC notation, it was adopted by the International Union of Pure and Applied Chemistry in 1991 as a simplification of the older Siegbahn notation.  In X-ray notation, every principal quantum number is given a letter associated with it. In many areas of physics and chemistry, atomic orbitals are described with spectroscopic notation (1s, 2s, 2p, 3s, 3p, etc.), but the more traditional X-ray notation is still used with most X-ray spectroscopy techniques including AES and XPS.

Conversion

Uses
X-ray sources are classified by the type of material and orbital used to generate them. For example, CuKα X-rays are emitted from the K orbital of copper.
X-ray absorption is reported as which orbital absorbed the x-ray photon. In EXAFS and XMCD the L-edge or the L absorption edge is the point where the L orbital begins to absorb x-rays.
Auger peaks are identified with three orbital definitions, for example KL1L2. In this case, K represents the hole that is initially present at the core level, L1 the initial state of the electron that relaxes down into the core level hole, and L2 the initial energy state of the emitted electron.

See also 
 Siegbahn notation for the names of spectral lines used in X-ray spectroscopy
 Spectroscopic notation
 Term symbol notation

References

Atomic physics
X-ray spectroscopy